MV Trepanier was a ferry that operated between the communities of Naramata and Summerland on Okanagan Lake in British Columbia, Canada. Trepanier was added to the Okanagan Lake Boat Company's fleet in 1912. The company's owner, Peter Roe, operated her and the earlier MV Skookum with his brothers, Fred and Gerald. Trepanier was purchased by Captain J. A. Noyes and his brother, I. R. Noyes, and used for pleasure trips until November 1913, when the larger MV Skookum, built in 1912 and not to be confused with the Skookum mentioned earlier, collided with the Canadian Pacific Railway company-operated SS Castlegar and sank. Although Trepanier was smaller than Skookum, she was used as a replacement and began regular ferry service soon after the crash.

References

Ferries of British Columbia
History of British Columbia
Culture of the Okanagan